The 2018 Asian Sailing Championship will be held in Jakarta, Indonesia 24–30 June.

Summary

Medal table

Event medalists

Senior events

Youth events

References

Asian Sailing Championship
Asian Sailing Championship
Sailing competitions in Indonesia
2018 in Indonesian sport
Asian Sailing Championship